Bathgate Lower railway station was a railway station serving the town of Bathgate in West Lothian, Scotland. It was located on the Bathgate Branch of the Monkland Railways.

History

Bathgate was opened by the Monkland Railways in 1856, and renamed Bathgate Lower on 1 August 1865 by the North British Railway at the same time as the Edinburgh and Bathgate Railway station of the same name was renamed Bathgate Upper.

The station was closed, along with the other station on the branch -  - by the LNER on 1 May 1930.

Bathgate Lower was situated between Easton Road and Cochrane Street in Bathgate. From the station, a branch continued to Balbardie Colliery to the north east of the station, and a further branch to Easton Colliery to the south west of the station. The main branch continued 4 miles and 6 chains west from Bathgate Lower to Blackston Jct, where it joined the Slamannan Railway

Services

References

Notes

Sources 
 
 
 
 RAILSCOT on Bathgate Branch of Monkland Railways

Disused railway stations in West Lothian
Former North British Railway stations
Railway stations in Great Britain opened in 1856
Railway stations in Great Britain closed in 1930
Bathgate